Roger James is a New Zealand Thoroughbred racehorse trainer. He is notable for having trained five New Zealand Derby winners, which is more than any other trainer in New Zealand and for having won many Group One races in New Zealand and Australia.

He has trained in excess of 1,200 winners.

Roger James has trained on his own account but also in partnership with:
 Jim Gibbs
 Lance Noble
 Paul Mirabelli 
 Ron Taylor
 Robert Wellwood

Notable horses and victories

Roger James has trained or co-trained a large number of high-class horses, including:
  
 Concert Hall, winner of the 2020 Zabeel Classic.
 Foxwood, winner of the 1998 Captain Cook Stakes.
 Hades, winner of the 1999 New Zealand Derby.
 He's Remarkable, first past the post in the 2011 Railway Stakes at Ascot but demoted on protest by Perth stewards.
 Pinarello, winner of the 2022 Championship Stakes and Queensland Derby.
 Prowess, winner of the 2023 Karaka Million 3YO Classic
 Roysyn, winner of the 1995 New Zealand Derby.
 Silent Achiever, winner of the 2012 New Zealand Derby, 2014 The BMW Stakes, Ranvet Stakes and New Zealand Stakes.
 Tidal Light, winner of the 1986 New Zealand Derby.
 Two Illicit, winner of the 2021 Captain Cook Stakes.
 Zonda, winner of the 1997 New Zealand Derby.

See also

 Murray Baker
 Opie Bosson
 Trevor McKee
 Lance O'Sullivan
 Jamie Richards
 Graeme Rogerson
 Chris Waller
 Thoroughbred racing in New Zealand

References 

Year of birth missing (living people)
Living people
New Zealand racehorse trainers
Sportspeople from Waikato